Spathulosporaceae is a family of fungi in the order Spathulosporales and Hypocreomycetidae subclass.

References

External links 
 

Ascomycota families